Dominique Voynet (born 4 November 1958) is a French politician who is a member of Europe Écologie–The Greens. She is the former mayor of Montreuil and was a French senator for the département of Seine-Saint-Denis.

Life 
Dominique Voynet trained as a doctor, specifically as an anesthetist. During her studies in the late 1970s, she began participating in environmental activism. She fought against the establishment of nuclear reactors in Fessenheim and Malville, and the deforestation of the Vosges area on behalf of the Belfort Association for the Protection of Nature.

She also became a member of Amnesty International and the French Democratic Confederation of Labour (CFDT). In her student years, she was a broadcaster for an independent radio station, "Radio ondes rouges" (Red Radio Waves). Her pacifist and environmental efforts continued with her membership of Front de lutte antimilitariste (FLAM, "Front for the Antimilitarist Struggle") and Friends of the Earth.

Politics tempted her at this time, however the issues that were dear to her – social efforts, peace and environmentalism – were not represented in France by any party at the time. For this reason, she became one of the founding members of The Greens in France.

In 1989 she was elected a Member of the European Parliament. From 1992 to 1994 she was a member of the conseil régional (regional council) of Franche-Comté.

She contested the 1995 presidential election which raised her public profile across all of France. In the first round of voting, she won 3.32% of the vote.

She was elected mayor of Montreuil sous bois in  the Seine Saint Denis on  the  second  round of  Municipal elections, 16 March 2008,  defeating  Jean Pierre  Brard longstanding communist  mayor  since  1984.

From 1997 to 2001 she was Minister of the Environment and Regional Planning under the Lionel Jospin government, she resigned on 9 July 2001 and was replaced by Yves Cochet. In 2004, she was elected senator for the Seine-Saint-Denis département. Since the 2008 French municipal elections she is the elected mayor of Montreuil

Dominique Voynet was designated the Green candidate for the 2007 presidential election on 19 July 2006. In the first round of the election, she garnered 576,666 votes (1.57%), failing to reach the second round.

On 25 November 2013 Voynet announced she would not seek a second term as mayor of Montreuil, complaining of the "degradation of political life" in Montreuil and elsewhere.

On 1 January 2020, Voynet became the Director of Mayotte Regional Health Agency.

Political positions 
In a 2016 op-ed published by Sunday newspaper Le Journal du Dimanche, Voynet joined sixteen other high-profile women from across the political spectrum – , including Élisabeth Guigou, Christine Lagarde, and Valérie Pécresse – in making a public vow to expose "all sexist remarks, inappropriate gestures and behaviour."

Political career 
Governmental function

Minister of Planning and Environment : 1997–2001.

Electoral mandates

European Parliament

Member of European Parliament : 1989–1991 (Resignation). Elected in 1989.

Senate of France

Senator of Seine-Saint-Denis : 2004–2011. Elected in 2004.

General Council

General councillor of Jura (department) : 1998–2004.

Regional Council

Regional councillor of Franche-Comté : 1992–1994 (Resignation).

Municipal Council

Mayor of Montreuil, Seine-Saint-Denis : 2008–2014.

Municipal councillor of Dole, Jura : 1989–2004 (Resignation). Reelected in 1995, 2001.

See also

Bibliography 
Voix off (Voices Off)
L'eau, numéro 22 (Water, Number 22)
Qui êtes-vous, que proposez-vous ? (Who are you, what do you propose?)

Works about Dominique Voynet 
Dominique Voynet : Une vraie nature (Dominique Voynet: Her True Nature) by Murielle Szac

References

External links 

 Dominique Voynet's official senatorial site
 Dominique Voynet's official campaign site for the 2007 presidential election
 http://dominiquevoynet.eelv.fr

1958 births
Living people
People from Montbéliard
French anesthesiologists
20th-century French physicians
21st-century French physicians
Mayors of places in Île-de-France
Candidates in the 1995 French presidential election
Candidates in the 2007 French presidential election
Women government ministers of France
Europe Ecology – The Greens politicians
French Democratic Confederation of Labour members
21st-century French women politicians
20th-century French women politicians
French Ministers of the Environment
Senators of Seine-Saint-Denis
Women opposition leaders
Women members of the Senate (France)
Women anesthesiologists
20th-century women physicians
21st-century women physicians